Dago may refer to:

Places 
 Dagö/Dagø, the Swedish/Danish name of Hiiumaa, Estonia
 Dago, Ghana, a village
 Dago, Bandung, an area in Bandung, West Java, Indonesia
 Dago Creek, Alaska
 The Hill, St. Louis, in St. Louis, Missouri, was referred to as "Dago Hill" in the early 20th century
 A slang term used to refer to the city of San Diego or San Diego County in California

People 
 Ananias Leki Dago (born 1970), Ivorian photographer
 Charles Dago (born 1975), Ivorian footballer
 Nadrey Dago (born 1997), Ivorian footballer
 Dago García, Colombian film producer Darío Armando García Granados (born 1962)
 Frank Cirofici (1887–1914), also known as Dago Frank, Italian-American gangster
 Frank Salvatore, also known as Mike the Dago, early 20th century Italian-American bootblack and politician

Arts and entertainment 
 Dagö, an Estonian folk rock band
 Dagö (album), the band's 2000 debut album
 Dago (comics), a Paraguayan comic book character

Other uses
 Dago (slur), an ethnic slur referring to Italians, and sometimes Spaniards and Portuguese
 DAGO, an acronym for Department of the Army General Officer
 DAGO (Directly Appointed Gazetted Officer), a rank in the Central Armed Police Forces of India

See also 
 
 Dego (disambiguation)